Basketball is an Atari 2600 video game written by Alan Miller and published by Atari, Inc. in 1978. The cartridge presents a simple game of one-on-one basketball playable by one or two players, one of the few early Atari 2600 titles to have a single-player mode with an AI-controlled opponent. Miller wrote a version of Basketball for the Atari 8-bit family with improved graphics, published in 1979. That same year, an arcade version similar to the computer port was released by Atari but in black and white.

Gameplay

At the start of the game, both players are at the center of the court. A jump ball is thrown between them to begin play. The player in the offensive position (i.e. in possession of the ball) always faces a basket representing the assigned shooting target, and defensive players always face the opponent. Each player can move in eight directions with the joystick; the player with the ball constantly dribbles it. The defensive player may steal the ball when it leaves the opponent's hands (either in mid-dribble or mid-shot).

After either player scores, the shooter is reset to the center of the court and becomes the defensive player (defending the opponent) while the former defender is set under the basket to inbound the ball and take an offensive chance. The player with the highest score after four minutes is the winner.

The game features two difficulty levels using the Difficulty Switch on the Atari 2600. In "B" position, the player can move from goal to goal much more quickly than the "A" position.

Reception
In Video magazine's "Arcade Alley" review column, reviewers described it as "that rare game that plays well solitaire or with a human opponent," and noted that "the game definitely captures the flavor of basketball." The "fan's eye perspective" was singled out for particular praise, and the game as a whole was found to "offer the most exciting four minutes of one-on-one hoop action [the reviewers had] seen so far."

Legacy
In the 1980 comedy film Airplane!, flight controllers are seen playing Atari 2600 Basketball rather than watching the monitor.

References

External links
Basketball for the Atari 2600 at Atari Mania
Basketball for the Atari 8-bit family at Atari Mania

Basketball at Arcade History

1978 video games
Atari games
Atari 2600 games
Atari 8-bit family games
Basketball video games
Multiplayer and single-player video games
Video games developed in the United States